Gesvres is a commune in the Mayenne department located in the Pays de la Loire region in north-western France. According to dat.gouv.fr website, the INSEE code for Gesvres is 53106, the postal code is 53370. The population of Gesvres was 509 in 2019.

See also
Communes of the Mayenne department
Parc naturel régional Normandie-Maine

References

Communes of Mayenne